Hallvard Rieber-Mohn (2 October 1922 – 4 August 1982) was a Norwegian Dominican priest and author.

Biography
He was born at Molde in Møre og Romsdal, Norway. His parents were Christian Joachim Rieber-Mohn (1891–1959) and Sophie Amalie Rosendahl (1892–1963). 
Rieber-Mohn grew up in Hamar, where his father was an editor of  Hamar Stiftstidende. Rieber-Mohn was a student at Saulchoir, the Dominican school of theology in Paris from 1945–53. He was then assigned by the Roman Catholic Diocese of Oslo to St. Dominican Church and Monastery at Neuberggata 15 in the neighborhood of Majorstuen in Oslo.

Rieber-Mohn was an official spokesman for the Roman Catholic Church in Norway. From 1959–66, he was the editor of the magazine St. Olav.
Besides being a columnist at Arbeiderbladet (now Dagsavisen), Rieber-Mohn was a regular contributor on NRK radio programs.
Rieber-Mohn debuted as an author in 1959 with a study of French poet and dramatist Paul Claudel (1868–1955).
In  1982, he completed an  essay  featuring  Norwegian author Sigrid Undset (1882–1949).
 
He won the Riksmål Society Literature Prize (Riksmålsforbundets litteraturpris) in 1967 and in 1982 he was awarded the Fritt Ord Award.

Selected works
Paul Claudel, 1956
Det blodige nei. Tyske skjebner fra Weimar til Bonn, 1967
Forrædere? Streiflys over landssvikets problem, 1969
Sideblikk, 1970
Midt på treet, 1972
Ossietzky, 1974
Reisegleder. Streiftog i land og sinn, 1975
Menneske først – kristen så, 1976
Fra politikk til forbrytelse, 1977
Alvorets glede, 1978
Dagbokblad, 1982
Sten på sten. Fem blikk på Sigrid Undset, 1982

References

1922 births
1982 deaths
People from Molde
Norwegian writers
Norwegian columnists
20th-century Norwegian writers
Norwegian Dominicans
Norwegian Roman Catholic priests
20th-century Roman Catholic priests